Lamellitrochus bicoronatus is a species of sea snail, a marine gastropod mollusk in the family Solariellidae.

Description
The height of the conico-turbinate shell attains 10 mm, but is usually less than 5 mm. Its typical characteristic is the subsutural angulation and the cord around the umbilicus formed by double rows of rounded tubercles.

Distribution
This species occurs in the Caribbean Sea off Barbados at a depth of 183 m.

References

 Quinn, J. F., Jr. 1991. Lamellitrochus, a new genus of Solariellinae (Gastropoda: Trochidae), with descriptions of six new species from the Western Atlantic Ocean. Nautilus 105: 81-91

External links
 To Biodiversity Heritage Library (1 publication)
 To Encyclopedia of Life
 To USNM Invertebrate Zoology Mollusca Collection
 To World Register of Marine Species

bicoronatus
Gastropods described in 1991